Adab in the context of behavior, refers to prescribed Islamic etiquette: "refinement, good manners, morals, decorum, decency, humaneness". Al-Adab has been defined as "decency, morals".

While interpretation of the scope and particulars of Adab may vary among different cultures, common among these interpretations is regard for personal standing through the observation of certain codes of behavior. To exhibit Adab would be to show "proper discrimination of correct order, behavior, and taste."

Islam has rules of etiquette and an ethical code involving every aspect of life. Muslims refer to Adab as good manners, courtesy, respect, and appropriateness, covering acts such as entering or exiting a washroom, posture when sitting, and cleansing oneself.

Customs and behaviour
Practitioners of Islam are generally taught to follow some specific customs in their daily lives. Most of these customs can be traced back to Abrahamic traditions in pre-Islamic Arabian society. Due to Muhammad's sanction or tacit approval of such practices, these customs are considered to be Sunnah (practices of Muhammad as part of the religion) by the Ummah (Muslim nation). It includes customs like:
 Saying "Bismillah" (in the name of Allah) before eating and drinking.
Drinking in 3 gulps slowly
 Using the right hand for drinking and eating.
 Saying "Assalaamualaikum warahmathullahi wabarakaatuhu" (may peace, mercy and blessings of Allah be upon you) when meeting someone and answering with "Wa 'alaikumus salam warahmathullahi wabarakaatuhu" (and peace mercy and blessings of Allah be upon you also ).
 Saying "Alhamdulillah" (all gratitude and praise is for only Allah) when sneezing and responding with "Yarhamukallah" (Allah have mercy on you).
 Saying the "Adhan" (prayer call) in the right ear of a newborn and the Iqama in its left.
 In the sphere of hygiene, it includes:
 Clipping the moustache
 Removing armpit hair regardless of gender
 Cutting nails
 Circumcising the male offspring
 Cleaning the nostrils, the mouth, and the teeth 
 Cleaning the body after urination and defecation
 Not entering a host's home until one has made sure their presence is welcome (hatta tasta nisu)
 Abstention from sexual relations during the menstrual cycle and the puerperal discharge, and ceremonial bath after the menstrual cycle, and Janabah (seminal/ovular discharge or sexual intercourse).
 Burial rituals include funeral prayer of bathed and enshrouded body in coffin cloth and burying it in a grave.

The list above is far from comprehensive. As Islam sees itself as more of a way of life than a religion, Islamic adab is concerned with all areas of an individual's life, not merely the list mentioned above.

Examples in hadiths of encouraging Adab

Hadith

Sunni hadith 
Abu 'Amr ash-Shaybani said, "The owner of this house (and he pointed at the house of 'Abdullah ibn Mas'ud) said, "I asked the Prophet, may Allah bless him and grant him peace, which action Allah loves best. He replied, 'Prayer at its proper time.' 'Then what?' I asked. He said, 'Then kindness to parents." I asked, 'Then what?' He replied, 'Then jihad in the Way of Allah.'" He added, "He told me about these things. If I had asked him to tell me more, he would have told me more." Kitab Al Adab Al Mufrad p. 29  Qahwama.com

Shia hadith 
Ali ibn Abi Talib the first Shiite Imam said:" Whoever leads the people must discipline others in his own way, deeds, and behavior before disciplining others with his language, and his instructor and educator deserve more respect than the educator and educator of the people".

and Ali ibn Husayn Zayn al-Abidin said:"It is your child's right to bring him up with good manners and morals".

Literature

A class of literature known as Adab is found in Islamic history. These were works written on the proper etiquette, manners for various professions and for ordinary Muslims, (examples include "manuals of advice for kings on how to rule and for physicians on how to care for patients"), and also works of fiction literature  that provide moral exemplars within their stories.

See also
Etiquette in the Middle East
List of Islamic terms in Arabic
lexicon

Notes and references

Bruce Privratsky, Muslim Turkistan, pgs. 98-99

Arabic words and phrases in Sharia
Islamic terminology